Mask Singer is a French reality television series based on the format of the South Korean television game show series King of Mask Singer by Munhwa Broadcasting Corporation. Run by TF1 Group, Mask Singer is a singing competition between celebrities donning elaborate costumes and face coverings to conceal their identity from the audience, judges and other contestants.

The first season of Mask Singer premiered 8 November 2019. Hosted by Camille Combal, it featured TV Host and producer Alessandra Sublet, singer Anggun as well as humorists Kev Adams and Jarry on the judging panel. The second season commenced filming in 2020, and aired from 17 October to 28 November 2020 with the same hosts on the panel. Third season started airing on April 1st 2022, features the exact same host and panel, along with a surprise fifth judge, a new addition to the series. Fourth season istarted to air on August 23rd 2022, on a weekly prime-time format.

Format
A group of celebrities compete anonymously on stage, singing in full costumes over a series of episodes. Each episode, a portion of the competitors are paired off into face-off competitions, in which each will perform a song of his/her choice. From each face-off, the panelists and live audience vote: the winner's safe for the week, while the loser is put up for elimination. At the end of the episode, the face-off's losers are then subjected to new votes of the panelists to determine who will not continue. The eliminated singer then enters a special room backstage where it turns its back to the camera, takes off its mask, then turns around to reveal his/her identity to the viewers.

In addition to the singing competition, hints to each masked singer's identity are offered during the show. Pre-taped interviews are given as hints and feature their distorted voices. The panelists are given time to speculate the identity of the singer after the performance and ask them a single question to try and determine their identity.

Panelists and host 
Following the announcement of the series, TF1 announced that the judging panel for season 1 would consist of Radio & TV Host Alessandra Sublet, singer Anggun and comedians Kev Adams and Jarry. Said panel remained for seasons 2 and 3. On June 4 2022, it was announced that three new panellists would join Kev Adams for the fourth season in replacement to Jarry, Alessandra Sublet and Anggun : ventriloquist and stand-up comedian Jeff Panacloc, actress and comedian Chantal Ladesou, and singer-songwriter Vitaa ; constitute the new panel of judges for season 4.

Season synopsis

Season 1 (2019)

Contestants

Episodes

Week 1 (8 November)

Week 2 (15 November)

Week 3 (22 November)
Two singers are to be eliminated this episode. Therefore, Sing-offs are canceled : 
Contestants sing only once before being subjected to the vote.

Group Number: "Uptown Funk" by Mark Ronson ft. Bruno Mars

Week 4 (29 November)
Two singers are to be eliminated this episode. Therefore, Sing-offs are canceled : 
Contestants sing only once before being subjected to the vote.

Week 5 (6 December)
Two singers are to be eliminated this episode. Therefore, Sing-offs are canceled : 
Contestants sing only once before being subjected to the vote.

Week 6 (13 December)
As only 4 characters are still in competition, run time allows for face-offs again. The 4th place was determined by a first round of duels then a face-off, while the top 3 was determined in a second round.

Round One

Round Two

Season 2 (2020)

Contestants

Episodes

Week 1 (17 October)

Week 2 (24 October)
Guest Performance: "Million Reasons" by Lady Gaga performed by Itziar Ituño as "Ballerina."

Week 3 (31 October)

Week 4 (7 November)
Panelist Performance: "Eye of the Tiger" by Survivor performed by Anggun as "Disco Ball."

Week 5 (21 November)
Group Number: "Allez reste" by Boulevard des Airs ft. Vianney

Week 6 (28 November)

Round One
For the first round the contestants did a duet with a previous contestant.

Round Two

Round Three

Season 3 (2022)

Contestants

Episodes

Week 1 (1 April)

Week 2 (8 April)
 Guest Performance: "Feeling Good" by Nina Simone performed by Teri Hatcher as Ladybug

Week 3 (15 April)

Week 4 (22 April)
 Guest Performance: "Le Banana Split" by Lio performed by Anne Roumanoff as Gorilla
 Guest Performance: "Envole-moi" by Jean-Jacques Goldman performed by Jarry as Elephant

Week 5 (29 April)
 Group Performance: "Ça (C'est Vraiment Toi)" by Téléphone
 Guest Performance: "With or Without You" by U2 performed by Seal as Cowboy

Week 6 (6 May)
 Guest Performance: "Pauvres Diables" by Julio Iglesias performed by Kendji Girac as Wolf

Week 7 (13 May)

Round One
 For the first round the contestants did a duet with a previous contestant.

Round Two

Round Three

Season 4 (2022)

Contestants

Episodes

Week 1 (23 August)

Week 2 (30 August)

Week 3 (6 September)
 Guest Performance: "My Way" by Frank Sinatra performed by David Hasselhoff as Cobra

Week 4 (13 September)

Week 5 (20 September)
 Group Performance: "Quand la musique est bonne" by Jean-Jacques Goldman
 Guest Performance: "Let's Twist Again" by Chubby Checker performed by Francis Huster" as "Viking"

Week 6 (27 September)
 Guest Performance: "Price Tag" by Jessie J ft. B.o.B performed by Tori Spelling as Cat

Week 7 (4 October)
 Guest Performance: "La Boîte de jazz" by Michel Jonasz performed by Inès Reg as Tigress

Week 8 (11 October)

Round One

Round Two

References

External links 
  (in French) (on TF1)

2019 French television series debuts
French-language television shows
French television series based on South Korean television series
Masked Singer
TF1 original programming